Cronus, also spelled "Cronos" or "Kronos", was the leader and the youngest of the first generation of Titans in Greek mythology.

Cronos may also refer to:

Arts and media

Fictional characters 
 Cronos (Bloody Roar), a playable character in Bloody Roar video games
 Vellian Crowler (Cronos de Medici), a teacher character in Yu-Gi-Oh! GX
Kronos in Percy Jackson and the Sea of Monsters
Cronos in Supernatural (U.S. TV series) Season 7 Episode 12 "Time After Time"
Cronos, a character in the video game series God of War

Other uses in arts and media
 Cronos (film), a 1992 Mexican horror film
 Conrad Lant (Cronos, born 1963), British musician
 Cronos (band), formed by Lant
 Machine Robo: Revenge of Cronos, a 1986 anime series

Other uses
 Mazda Cronos, a car brand in Japan 1991-1995
 Cronos, a humanist typeface by Robert Slimbach
 Fiat Cronos, a compact sedan car

See also
 Chronos, the personification of time in Greek mythology
Chronos (disambiguation)
Khronos (disambiguation)
Qo'noS, in Star Trek